"African and White" is a song by China Crisis. It was released as the band's debut single in 1981 on Inevitable Records. A remixed version of the song was reissued as a single by Virgin Records in 1982 and became the band's first appearance on the UK Singles Chart, peaking at number 45 in August 1982. The song is included on the band's debut album Difficult Shapes & Passive Rhythms, Some People Think It's Fun to Entertain and on several compilation albums.

Track listing
UK 7" single
"African and White"
"Be Suspicious"

UK 7" single (reissue, 1982)
"African and White" (Remix)
"Red Sails"

UK 12" single (reissue, 1982)
"African and White" (Remix / Extended Version)
"Red Sails"
"Be Suspicious"

References

1981 songs
1981 debut singles
1982 singles
China Crisis songs
Virgin Records singles